The 2009 season of the Bhutanese A-Division was the fifteenth recorded season of top-flight football in Bhutan. The league was won by Druk Star FC, their second title. They qualified as Bhutan's representatives in the 2010 AFC President's Cup.

League table
Teams played each other on a home and away basis, there was no relegation play-off this season, the bottom two teams were relegated automatically. Ngangpa were promoted from the B-Division for the 2010 season.

Results

References

Bhutan A-Division seasons
Bhutan
Bhutan
1